Chic was an American pornographic magazine first issued by Larry Flynt, of Hustler fame, in November 1976. The publisher was CHIC Magazine Inc. based in Columbus, Ohio.

Intentionally less controversial than Hustler, but similar overall in layout and content, the magazine was an attempt to emulate the more upscale style of rivals such as Penthouse and Oui. Early issues of Chic were oversized; the magazine changed to typical smaller dimensions in 1978.  
In 1979, Flynt went on trial for obscenity charges over eight issues of Hustler and three issues of Chic magazine.

In 1984, a Texas woman, Jeannie Braun, successfully sued Chic for publishing a photo of herself and "Ralph the Diving Pig" in the magazine. She had contended that the editor had misrepresented Chic as a fashion magazine.

Chic ceased publication in December 2001.

Contributors
 G. Gordon Liddy

References

1976 establishments in Ohio
Defunct magazines published in the United States
Erotica magazines published in the United States
Magazines established in 1976
Magazines disestablished in 2001
Magazines with year of disestablishment missing
Magazines published in Ohio
Mass media in Columbus, Ohio
Pornographic magazines published in the United States